Tučep is a village/settlement in the Istog municipality, Kosovo.

The village was predominantly Serb. Its Serb population was displaced in June 1999, following the Kosovo War, but returned subsequently. However they face harassment, and lack of electricity.

Population

See also
Anti-Serb sentiment

Notes

References

Villages in Istog
Serbian enclaves in Kosovo
Anti-Serbian sentiment